Medgadget is a weblog about medical technologies. The website was founded in 2004 and is known for its up-to-date coverage of the international medical technology news, health care trends, and medical research. Medgadget was launched in December 2004.

With a reported 750+ thousand monthly pageviews,Medgadget ranks as one of the world's most trafficked and linked to medical blogs in the world. Fox News noted Medgadget as one of the 10 best health blogs in 2010,and the site has been described by Silicon Valley Business Journal as "a popular Web site that focuses on emerging medical devices and technologies.

References

External links
Official Website

Internet properties established in 2004
American medical websites